Tankyrase-2 is an enzyme that in humans is encoded by the TNKS2 gene.

Interactions
TNKS2 has been shown to interact with GRB14, TERF1 and Cystinyl aminopeptidase.

References

Further reading